Sandy Campbell (April 22, 1922 – June 26, 1988) was a Broadway actor, and later editor and publisher, mainly for his life-partner, Donald Windham.

Early life
Sandy Campbell was born in New York City in 1922, the son of the owner of a chemical manufacturing company.

He attended Kent School, Connecticut and then studied at Princeton University.

Career
After college, Sandy Campbell tried to become an actor in Broadway; he was in Life with Father, Spring Awakening, and A Streetcar Named Desire. In more than 20 years of acting he played alongside actors by the like of Marlon Brando, Spencer Tracy, Jessica Tandy, Tallulah Bankhead, Lynn Fontanne, Alfred Lunt, Lois Smith. On the screen he can be seen in Shades of Gray (1948), Man Against Crime (1949) and The Philco Television Playhouse (1948).

Campbell was a book collector, avid reader and publisher. His collection includes signed first editions by Graham Greene, Vladimir Nabokov, William Faulkner, E.M. Forster, Katherine Anne Porter, Isak Dinesen, Alice B. Toklas, and Marianne Moore.

As author, Campbell wrote biographies for Harper's Magazine, among whom those of Nora Joyce, E.M. Forster, Lynn Fontanne and Alfred Lunt. He also collaborated with The New Yorker as fact checker and book reviewer. He wrote B: Twenty-Six Letters from Coconut Grove, an account of his experience playing A Streetcar Named Desire alongside Tallulah Bankhead.

He stopped acting in the 1950s and he devoted himself to publishing and editing Donald Windham's books through the Stamperia Valdonega in Verona, Italy.

Personal life
Sandy Campbell met Donald Windham in 1943 while Campbell was modeling for painter Paul Cadmus. The relationship lasted until Campbell's death in 1988.

Legacy
Campbell left his estate to Windham with the agreement that, at Windham's death, the remaining of the estate would be used to create a literary prize. The Donald Windham Sandy M. Campbell Literature Prizes was established in 2011 by Yale University.

Sandy Campbell's book collection is preserved inside the Beinecke Rare Book & Manuscript Library.

Filmography

References

External links 

Donald Windham and Sandy Campbell papers at Beinecke Rare Book and Manuscript Library, Yale University
Sandy Campbell material in the Robert A. Wilson collection at Special Collections, University of Delaware Library

1922 births
1988 deaths
American gay actors
American male stage actors
American publishers (people)
Kent School alumni
American male film actors
20th-century American biographers
20th-century American memoirists
American male non-fiction writers
American gay writers
20th-century American male actors
20th-century American male writers
20th-century American LGBT people